Strike the Mics is the first studio album released by Vintage Blue on February 14, 2012.  It contains thirteen tracks produced by Jamie Candiloro (R.E.M., Ryan Adams, Red Wanting Blue). It was recorded at Rax Trax Recording in Chicago, Illinois. The album has received national AAA radio airplay at WOCM and WXRT.

Critics described the record and band as "the musical equivalent of comfort food. The rock band’s sound is familiar and accessible without a hint of pretense.”.  As the band toured the record, the live shows were said to be high energy and interactive fun for all involved.  One reviewer said: "Vintage Blue is the kind of rock band I like to see, because they just wanna have a good time. There’s no pretensions about putting on a perfect show. It’s much more important that everyone have fun and leave smiling.".

Track listing

Personnel
 Benjamin Bassett – lead guitar, lead vocals 
 Ryan Tibbs – rhythm guitar, lead vocals
 Cesar Corral – bass guitar 
 Will Crowden – drums
 Matt Zimmerman – saxophonist, background vocals

References

2012 debut albums
Vintage Blue albums